Manuel Anatol Aristegi (8 May 1903 – 17 May 1990) was a naturalized French professional footballer and athlete.

Football career 
Anatol was born in Irun, a town in the Basque Country of Spain. A defender, he played for three clubs in the country; hometown club Real Unión, Athletic Bilbao and Real Madrid. In 1929, Anatol ventured to France and joined Racing Paris. With Racing, he captained the club to the final of the Coupe de France in his second season with the club. In the final, Racing were defeated 3–1 by FC Sète.

Initially overlooked due to his Spanish roots (as was René Petit), Anatol was naturalised as a French citizen in 1929 and made his national team debut on 24 March 1929 in a 2–0 victory over Portugal. He made 15 more appearances with the team and scored his only goal on 23 March 1930 in a 3–3 draw with Switzerland. The goal was scored from  out. He could not take part in the 1930 FIFA World Cup due to being unable to take the required time off work, and was not selected for the France squad four years later.

Athletics career
Anatol was also a talented sprinter who won the 100 metres, 200 metres, 400 metres and 4 × 400 metres relay events at the 1923 edition of the Spanish Athletics Championships; however, as he had documentation as a French national (his father was from the French Basque Country although Manuel had lived in Spain all his life up to that point) the wins were awarded to the runners-up instead, and remain as such in the records. He subsequently competed at the 1924 Summer Olympics under the name M. A. Aristegui which may have been an administrative error due to Spanish naming customs, or a subtle attempt by him to conceal his identity from either the athletics organisers or the management at his football club. He did not progress past the opening heats of the 400 metres event.

References

External links

1903 births
1990 deaths
Sportspeople from Irun
Association football defenders
French footballers
France international footballers
Spanish footballers
Footballers from the Basque Country (autonomous community)
Spanish expatriate footballers
Expatriate footballers in France
French people of Spanish descent
Naturalized citizens of France
Real Unión footballers
Athletic Bilbao footballers
Real Madrid CF players
Racing Club de France Football players
Montpellier HSC players
Atlético Madrid footballers
Ligue 1 players
La Liga players
Segunda División players
Spanish male sprinters
Olympic athletes of Spain
Athletes (track and field) at the 1924 Summer Olympics
Athletes from the Basque Country (autonomous community)